Jamhuri Stadium is a multi-purpose stadium in Morogoro, Tanzania.  It is currently used mostly for football matches and serves as the home venue for Moro United.  It currently holds 20,000 people.

References

Football venues in Tanzania
Morogoro
Multi-purpose stadiums in Tanzania
Buildings and structures in the Morogoro Region
Chama Cha Mapinduzi